Hannu Juhani Siitonen (born 18 March 1949) is a retired Finnish javelin thrower. He competed at the 1972 and 1976 Olympics and placed fourth and second, respectively. He won the European javelin title in 1974 and finished fourth in 1971.

References

1949 births
Living people
People from Parikkala
Finnish male javelin throwers
Olympic silver medalists for Finland
Athletes (track and field) at the 1972 Summer Olympics
Athletes (track and field) at the 1976 Summer Olympics
Olympic athletes of Finland
European Athletics Championships medalists
Medalists at the 1976 Summer Olympics
Olympic silver medalists in athletics (track and field)
Sportspeople from South Karelia